Hatzor Israeli Air Force Base , also titled Kanaf 4 (lit. Wing 4) is an Israeli Air Force military air base, located in central Israel near kibbutz Hatzor after which it is named. It was opened RAF Qastina in 1942 by the Royal Air Force of the United Kingdom of Great Britain and Northern Ireland in the then British Protectorate of Palestine.

History

RAF Qastina
RAF Qastina, after the nearby Palestinian village of the same name, was an RAF station in Palestine between 1942 and 1948.

On the night of 25 February 1946, Irgun militants attacked the airfield and destroyed several parked RAF Handley Page Halifax transports.  Two additional RAF airfields, RAF Lydda (Ben Gurion International Airport) and RAF Kfar Sirkin, were attacked in what became known as the "Night of the Airplanes".  Altogether, the attacks destroyed 20 RAF aircraft and damaged several others.  Following these attacks, the RAF closed some of its Palestine bases to Egypt.

RAF Units stationed at RAF Qastina:
No. 47 Squadron RAF (1946) Handley Page Halifax A.7 & A.9
No. 512 Squadron RAF (1945) Douglas Dakota
No. 644 Squadron RAF (1945-1946) Handley Page Halifax A.7 & A.9
No. 651 Squadron RAF (1947-1948) Auster AOP6

On 15 March 1948, as the British Mandate for Palestine drew to a close, the RAF evacuated the airfield and it was taken over by Haganah forces.

Israeli Air Force Base Hatzor
On the morning of 16 August 1966, an Iraqi Mikoyan-Gurevich MiG-21 landed at Hatzor, the culmination of Operation Diamond. Munir Redfa, an Iraqi Air Force pilot, had been persuaded by the Mossad to fly the flagship of the Soviet export aircraft industry to Israel.  The MiG was the most advanced aircraft in Arab inventories at the time.

Hatzor has a network of eight simulator pods which use satellite footage of countries including Lebanon and Syria to train pilots for deep strike missions.

On April 2, 2017, the first two batteries of Israel’s latest missile defense system - the David’s Sling - went operational on the Air Base.

Israeli Air Force Units
 100st Squadron – operating Beechcraft B-200 "King Air" & Beechcraft A36 "Bonanza"
 420th Squadron - operating Flightsimulator Network
 2 Batteries of David's Sling Missile System

See also
 List of Royal Air Force stations

References

1942 establishments in Mandatory Palestine
Israeli Air Force bases
Military units and formations established in 1942